"Love to Life" is a song by English pop rock trio Twenty Twenty, and released on their debut studio album Small Talk. The single was released in the United Kingdom on 17 April 2011. It peaked to number 60 on the UK Singles Chart.

Music video
The music video for the song was uploaded to YouTube on 10 March 2011.

Track listing

Charts

Release history

References

2011 singles
2011 songs
Geffen Records singles
Songs written by Julian Emery